Cholera Street (Original Turkish title: Ağır Roman, literally meaning "Heavy Romani") is a 1997 Turkish film  directed by Mustafa Altıoklar, adapted from Metin Kaçan's best selling novel Ağır Roman.

Plot
The film is set in a rundown, crime ridden neighborhood of Istanbul dubbed "Cholera Street" (Kolera Sokağı). Salih is a mechanic and son of a respected barber Ali. A woman Tina arrives at Cholera street where she takes up residence and works as a prostitute. Deniz is a gangster who gives himself the nickname "Reiss" ("Chief"), tries to take control of the neighbourhood through intimidation.

After Reiss takes over a horse stable and causes the suicide of the owner, Arap Sado (a close friend of Salih) challenges Reiss to a knife duel and after defeating him, demands that he leave the neighborhood. One night, a prostitute is murdered with her genitals cut out, and this causes fears of a serial killer on the loose called the "Kolera Canavarı" ("Cholera Monster"). Sado is targeted by Reis' men in a drive by shooting and he dies in Salih's arms after giving him his prized pocket knife.

With Sado dead, Reiss opens a casino and seeks to dominate the neighbour. At the opening of Sado's bust, Salih and Reiss clash on the street, during which the public defies Reis and side with Salih. Tina invites Salih to her home that night, after which Tina and Salih become a couple. Salih gets Tina to promise that she will give up prostitution, but this causes hardship because they now have no income. The "Cholera Monster" strikes again and murders "Puma" Zehra (the madame of a brothel) on Salih's watch. Reiss takes advantage of the situation, declaring himself protector of the neighborhood and turning the public against Salih.

Salih becomes suspicious after Tina returns late and confronts her about it. Tina tries to justify her returning to prostitution by saying that they needed money to survive. While Tina runs away from an angry Salih, she is attacked by the "Cholera Monster" but Salih manages save her and subdue him.

Tina's former pimp Nihat is distraught at the loss of his livelihood and his treatment at hands of Tina. He goes to Reis who takes him in and draws up a scheme to get rid of Salih. After being provoked by Reis, Nihat attacks Tina and slashes her cheek with a blade at a wedding. Salih runs him down, kills him and cuts his cheek off with a knife. The corrupt police chief who is under Reis' pay, arrests Salih and tries to force him to confess to the murder. Reis approaches Tina and makes a deal that he will get Salih released if she gives herself to him. When Salih returns home, he finds Reiss and Tina together in bed; he becomes distraught and cuts himself and bleeds to death. As an act of revenge, Tina gets into Reis' car and blows it up with Reiss and herself in it.

Cast
Okan Bayülgen - Salih
Müjde Ar - Tina
Mustafa Uğurlu - Reis
Savaş Dinçel - Berber Ali
Burak Sergen - Arap Sado
Küçük İskender - Orhan
Aysel Gürel - Puma Zehra
Levent Erim - Fil Hamit
Zafer Algöz - Gaftici Fethi
Nilüfer Aydan - Eleni
Sevda Ferdağ - Emine
Zühtü Erkan - Tıbi
Balık Ayhan - Balık Ayhan (himself)
Naci Taşdöğen - Nihat
Emrah Kolukısa - Reco
Yeşim Tan - Leyla
Osman Çağlar - Poğaçacı Piyale
İlhan Kilimci - Tornacı
Hülya Karakaş - Malbuşçu

Awards
Ağır Roman won 3 awards at the 35th Antalya Film Festival: "Best Supporting Actor" (Mustafa Uğurlu), "Best Supporting Actress" (Sevda Ferdağ) and "Best Art Director" (Mustafa Ziya Ülkenciler). Additionally, Okan Bayülgen was awarded "Best Actor" at the 3rd Sadri Alışık awards.

References

External links

1997 romantic drama films
1997 LGBT-related films
1997 films
1990s Turkish-language films
Films based on Turkish novels
Films set in Istanbul
Films set in Turkey
Turkish LGBT-related films
Films scored by Attila Özdemiroğlu
Turkish romantic drama films